Strzałków may refer to the following places:
Strzałków, Łódź Voivodeship (central Poland)
Strzałków, Masovian Voivodeship (east-central Poland)
Strzałków, Świętokrzyskie Voivodeship (south-central Poland)
Strzałków, Greater Poland Voivodeship (west-central Poland)